Psamathocrita innotatella is a moth of the family Gelechiidae. It was described by Pierre Chrétien in 1915. It is found in Tunisia.

The wingspan is about 11 mm. The forewings are white. The hindwings are greyish brown.

References

Moths described in 1915
Psamathocrita